Jean-Jacques "Babik" Reinhardt (8 June 1944 – 13 November 2001) was a French guitarist and the younger son of gypsy jazz guitarist Django Reinhardt by Django's second wife, Naguine. His elder half-brother Lousson, who was Django's son by his first wife, Bella, was also a guitarist, but the two grew up in different families and rarely met. He was christened Jean-Jacques but generally known by his family nickname, Babik.

Biography
Babik Reinhardt was born in Paris. He learned guitar not from his father, who died when he was nine years old, but from his uncles such as Nin-Nin (Joseph) and Eugène Vées, as well others of his own generation such as Vées' sons Loulou and Mitsou. According to writer Fred Sharp, his father had initially encouraged him to take up the piano, believing that "there would be more work for a pianist than a guitarist". At age 15 he appeared in Jean-Christophe Averty's 1959 film "Hommage a Django Reinhardt", playing rhythm acoustic guitar behind Eugène Vées, Joseph Reinhardt, Stéphane Grappelli, etc. By age 18 he was playing electric guitar with the French rock and roll group "Glenn Jack et ses Glenners", led by Glen Jack (real name Jacques Vérières), appearing on several of their EP releases in 1962.

Babik's first jazz recordings were made in 1967 with the organist George Arvanitis, with four tracks released as an EP "Swing 67" (including 2 Babik originals and 2 compositions of his father) in 1967. From 1968 onwards, Babik started releasing albums in his own name, commencing with a set of tunes by Sidney Bechet played on electric (Gibson ES-175) guitar with a small group. A 1973 album "Sinti Houn Brazil" included three lengthy original compositions, in more of a bossa nova style, while a 1974 release, "Sur Le Chemin De Mon Pere...Django" comprised mostly compositions by his father, but played in a mainstream electric style. "Three Of A Kind" (1975) was a collaboration with the gypsy guitarists Christian Escoudé and Boulou Ferré in a contemporary jazz style, and included a 5-minute medley of Django Reinhardt compositions. This was followed by additional albums "All Love" and others through the 1980s and 1990s, all in a mainstream/contemporary jazz style; he also appeared (sharing lead duties with Romane) playing electric (hollow body) guitar on the 1998 album released under the name "New Quintet Du Hot Club De France", playing material including four Django compositions plus three of his own originals in a lightly swinging, modern update of the original hot club style. In the 1990s, Babik arranged and/or contributed the music for two French films, "Le Prix Du Silence" (1990) directed by Jacques Ertaud, and "Mohammad Bertrand Duval" by Alex Métayer (1991).

Drawn more to jazz fusion than gypsy jazz, Babik recorded with fusion pioneer Larry Coryell and French violinist Didier Lockwood in the 1990s. Babik visited the USA to perform on several occasions, his last appearance being at Birdland in New York City in 2000. In 2001, he died of a heart attack at the age of 57 in Cannes, France. Babik and his wife Nadine's son, David Reinhardt, Django's grandson (born 1986), is also a performer in the gypsy jazz style and was tutored by his father from the age of six.

One track from Babik appeared posthumously on the album Generation Django (Dreyfus, 2009), a tribute to his father recorded by multiple musicians, including Babik's son, David, and Biréli Lagrène.

Discography
 Glenn Jack Et Ses Glenners Avec Babik Django Reinhardt: Moi, Je Pense Encore À Toi (EP, Festival, 1962)
 Glenn Jack Et Ses Glenners Avec Babik "Django" Reinhardt: Jenny (EP, Festival, 1962)
 Swing 67 (EP, Vogue, 1967)
 Joue Sidney Bechet (Vogue, 1968)
 Sinti Houn Brazil (CBS, 1973)
 Sur Le Chemin De Mon Pere...Django (Music for Pleasure, 1974)
 Christian Escoudé, Boulou Ferré & Babik Reinhardt: Three of A Kind (JMS, 1985)
 All Love (RDC, 1988)
 Nuances (RDC, 1992)
 Vibration (RDC, 1995)
 Live (1996)
 A Night in Conover (RDC, 1998)
 Various artists: Django Reinhardt NY Festival: Live at Birdland (Atlantic, 2001) - 2 tracks only
 Various artists: Swing Gitan (Vertical Jazz, 2003?) - live recording from the 2002 Django Reinhardt NY Festival at Birdland - one track featuring Babik from the 2000 festival is included as a bonus track
 Babik Joue Django (RDC, 2003) (?compilation)

Films
 1959 Hommage a Django Reinhardt (playing rhythm guitar with Eugène Vées, Joseph Reinhardt, Stéphane Grappelli, etc.)
 1991 John Jeremy film The Django Legacy (1 track only)
 1995 Django: A Jazz Tribute, Biréli Lagrène and Babik Reinhardt live duets (re-released 2005, DVD)

References

External links
 

1944 births
2001 deaths
20th-century guitarists
21st-century guitarists
Continental jazz guitarists
French jazz guitarists
French male guitarists
French Romani people
Romani guitarists
Gypsy jazz musicians
Swing guitarists
20th-century French musicians
20th-century French male musicians
21st-century French male musicians
French male jazz musicians